The Golden Girls is an American television sitcom created by Susan Harris and produced by Witt/Thomas/Harris Productions. The series focuses on four older women all sharing a home in Miami, Florida. Bea Arthur, Betty White, Rue McClanahan and Estelle Getty portray the four main characters Dorothy Zbornak, Rose Nylund, Blanche Devereaux and Sophia Petrillo. The Golden Girls aired on NBC from September 14, 1985, to May 9, 1992, broadcasting 180 episodes over seven seasons during its initial run.

During the series' run, The Golden Girls received nominations for a variety of different awards, including 68 Emmy Awards (with 11 wins), 21 Golden Globe Awards (with 4 wins), 5 American Comedy Awards (all wins), 3 Directors Guild of America Awards (with 2 wins), and 5 Writers Guild of America Awards (with one win). The lead actresses all won Emmy Awards — Arthur, McClanahan and White won the award for Outstanding Lead Actress in a Comedy Series and Getty won for Outstanding Supporting Actress in a Comedy Series. The cast were named Disney Legends in 2009.

Awards and nominations

American Comedy Awards
Betty White won an American Comedy Award for Funniest Female Performer in a TV Series (Leading Role) Network, Cable or Syndication in 1987 and received a nomination for the award in 1990. In 1990, White also received the Lifetime Achievement Award in Comedy. Estelle Getty won the award for Funniest Supporting Female Performer in a TV Series in 1991 and 1992.

ASCAP Film and Television Music Awards

BMI Film & TV Awards

Directors Guild of America Awards
Director Jay Sandrich won a Directors Guild of America Award for Outstanding Directing – Comedy Series in 1985 for his work on the pilot episode "The Engagement". Terry Hughes, one of the series' most prominent directors, received the award the following year for his work on the second-season episode "Isn't it Romantic?". Hughes was also nominated for the same award in 1987, but lost to Will Mackenzie, for the Family Ties episode "My Name is Alex".

Emmy Awards

The Golden Girls received 58 Primetime Emmy Award nominations, with eleven wins — eight Primetime and three Creative Arts. The series won the award for Outstanding Comedy Series in 1986 and 1987. All four principal stars won an Emmy Award for their performances, a milestone that three other series (All in the Family, Will & Grace, and Schitt’s Creek) have achieved; of these four series, it is the only one whose cast had actors competing against each other in the same category. Betty White won the award for Outstanding Lead Actress in a Comedy Series in 1986, with Rue McClanahan winning the award in 1987 and Bea Arthur winning in 1988. In 1988, Estelle Getty won the award for Outstanding Supporting Actress in a Comedy Series. Barry Fanaro and Mort Nathan won the Primetime Emmy Award for Outstanding Writing for a Comedy Series for the first-season episode "A Little Romance". Terry Hughes won the award for Outstanding Directing for a Comedy Series for the season two episode "Isn't It Romantic?". The three Creative Arts Emmy Awards the series won were for Outstanding Technical Direction/Electronic Camerawork/Video Control for a Series in 1986, 1988 and 1992.

Primetime Emmy Awards

Creative Arts Emmy Awards

Golden Globe Awards

The Golden Girls received 21 Golden Globe Award nominations during its tenure, with four wins — three for Best Television Series – Musical or Comedy in 1986, 1987, and 1988. Estelle Getty won the award for Best Actress – Television Series Musical or Comedy, tying with Moonlightings Cybill Shepherd for the award.

TV Land Awards

Viewers for Quality Television Awards

Writers Guild of America (WGA)

Young Artist Awards

Other awards

References

Golden Girls, The
The Golden Girls